Margaret Gibson may refer to:

Margaret Gibson (actress) (1894–1964), American actress
Margaret Gibson (rower) (born 1961), Zimbabwean Olympic rower
Margaret Gibson (writer) (1948–2006), Canadian novelist and short story writer 
Margaret Gibson (historian) (1938–1994), British medieval historian and academic
Margaret Gibson (poet) (born 1944), American poet
Margaret Gibson (swimmer) (born 1938), Australian swimmer
Margaret Dunlop Gibson (1843–1920), British orientalist
Margaret Muriel Gibson (politician) (1912–2005), Scottish nationalist politician